Herve Pierre Djanal (born June 3, 1986) is a Cameroonian football goalkeeper, he currently plays for Bangkok Glass FC.

Career
Djanal has played for Thailand Premier League clubside Samut Songkhram.

References

1986 births
Living people
Cameroonian footballers
Expatriate footballers in Myanmar
Footballers from Douala
Expatriate footballers in Thailand
Cameroonian expatriate sportspeople in Thailand
Association football goalkeepers
Djanal Herve Pierre
Djanal Herve Pierre
Hanthawaddy United F.C. players